KLHB (105.5 MHz) is a commercial FM radio station licensed to Portland, Texas, and serving the Corpus Christi metropolitan area.  The station airs a rhythmic contemporary radio format and is owned by Steven and Nisa Zap, through licensee Starlite Broadcasting.  Its studios are located in the Six Points district south of downtown Corpus Christi and the transmitter is in downtown atop the Wells Fargo building.

History
On December 15, 1979, the station first signed on as KITE.  In 1987, the station became Top 40 outlet KJKC.  It went through several changes in ownership and call signs until 2004 when it was acquired by Tejas Broadcasting.  Tejas at first installed a Regional Mexican format on the station, which later became Spanish-language Top 40.

On August 31, 2015, KLHB switched to an all sports format, calling itself "105.5 The Zone" and carrying ESPN Radio programming.  It became an ESPN network affiliate after 1440 KEYS gave up its ESPN affiliation, switching from sports to talk radio.

On August 1, 2017, the station began stunting in anticipation of a new format. On August 7, KLHB debuted a mainstream top 40 format called "Wild 105.5", but quickly segued to rhythmic top 40 one week later.

On January 30, 2019, Tejas Broadcasting sold both KLHB and KLTG to Starlite Broadcasting for $600,000. The two stations kept their previous formats. The sale was consummated on April 11, 2019.

References

External links

Rhythmic contemporary radio stations in the United States
LHB